The Travellers are a music band from the Maltese island of Gozo. They released "Sempliċità" ("Simplicity"), their debut single,  in January 2016. Their sound is characterized by Maltese lyrics accompanied by brass-based pop music.

History 
The band was formed in 2013 with the aim to create something different within the Maltese music scene. Clayton Bonello (bass guitar), Joseph Xerri (trumpet), Chris Gatt (main vocals), and Andrew Vella (guitar and backing vocals) were the original members. Sylvano Mizzi (saxophone and keyboards) and Micheal Camilleri (drums) joined later in the same year.

All members of the band come from the smaller Maltese island of Gozo. Just as other inhabitants of Gozo, they often have to take the boat to cross over to the main island. This was the inspiration for the band name. This is also referred to in their song "Il-Vjaġġatur" ("The Traveller") from their 2021 album Inżul u Tlajja'. Their debut single "Sempliċità" was a success and their two subsequent 2016 singles both topped the Maltese charts.

Lyrics 
All the songs released by The Travellers are in Maltese.

In 2018, The Travellers released the song "Ilkoll Flimkien" ("All Together"). The lyrics include excerpts from the poem "Jekk" ("If") by the poet Oliver Friggieri.

Some of their songs focus on current affairs or social issues. In fact, The Travellers have collaborated with various local entities to create awareness about various issues. With their song "Il-Biża'" ("The Fear"), The Travellers collaborated with Richmond Foundation, an organization that offers support related to mental health. The ending of the music video for the song lists contact information for ways to receive mental health support. With their song "Siġġu Vojt" ("Empty Chair"), The Travellers collaborated with Transport Malta for the 2021 campaign against drinking and driving over the Christmas and New Year period.

Discography

Singles 
[[File:Inżul_u_Tlajja_Album_The_Travellers_Maltese_Band.jpeg|thumb|Inżul u Tlajja''' album in CD format]]The Travellers have released 15 singles, each with its own music video. 14 of these singles are included in an EP or album, while "X'inhu L-Milied Għalik" was a stand-alone release and the band's first Christmas track.
 Sempliċità (2016)
 Dak li Int (2016)
 Xemx u Xita (2016)
 Ħafi Paċi Kuluri (2017)
 Ilkoll Flimkien (2018)
 Tpenġijiet (2018)
 Umani (2018)
 Iljuni fis-Silġ (2019)
X'inhu L-Milied Għalik? (2020)
Il-Biża' (2021)
Inżul U Tlajja' (2021)
Siġġu Vojt (2021)
Ħobbni Kemm Trid (2022)
Fejn Mar Il-Kwiet (2022)
Is-Sbuħija ta’ Dan iż-Żmien (2022)

 Albums 
The Travellers have released one EP and two full albums.  
 Xemx U Xita - EP (2016)
 Iljuni Fis-Silġ - Full Album (2018)Inżul U Tlajja''' - Full Album (2021)

Remixes 

 Is-Sbuħija ta’ Dan iż-Żmien (Carlo Gerada Remix) (2022)

Notable collaborations 
The Travellers have collaborated with Maltese band Red Electric in the creation of a series of concerts where members of the two bands perform as a single large band. During these concerts the setlists include songs from the discographies of both bands. Concerts were performed in 2019 and 2022. In 2019, the concert was called "1". In 2022, it was called "ONE" and part of the proceeds from this concert were donated to the McDonald House Charities Malta which is an organization that helps families in need.

In 2022, local DJ and producer Carlo Gerada produced the first official remix of any song by The Travellers. He produced a remix of the song "Is-Sbuħija ta’ Dan iż-Żmien".

Awards and accolades

References

External links 
 The Travellers official website
 The Travellers YouTube channel

Maltese musical groups
Gozitan singers
Musical groups established in 2013
2013 establishments in Malta
Maltese music